Harold Everette Kolstad (born June 1, 1935 in Rice Lake, Wisconsin) is a former pitcher in Major League Baseball who played from  through  for the Boston Red Sox. He was signed by Boston as a free agent in 1957 out of the San Jose State University.

In a two-season MLB career, Kolstad posted a 0–4 win–loss mark with 42 strikeouts and a 6.59 ERA in 34 appearances, including two starts, two saves and 72⅓ innings pitched. He surrendered 81 hits and 41 bases on balls.

In 1966, Kolstad joined the faculty at Leigh High School in San Jose, California as a teacher and coach. He remained there until his retirement in 1990.

References

External links

1935 births
Living people
Albany Senators players
Allentown Red Sox players
American people of Norwegian descent
Baseball players from Wisconsin
Baseball players from San Jose, California
Boston Red Sox players
Greensboro Patriots players
Major League Baseball pitchers
Minneapolis Millers (baseball) players
People from Rice Lake, Wisconsin
People from Watsonville, California
San Jose State Spartans baseball players
Seattle Angels players
Seattle Rainiers players
Waterloo Hawks (baseball) players